The 1997 All-Ireland Under-21 Hurling Championship was the 34th staging of the All-Ireland Under-21 Hurling Championship since its establishment by the Gaelic Athletic Association in 1964. The championship began on 18 June 1997 and ended on 21 September 1997.

Galway entered the championship as the defending champions.

On 21 September 1997, Cork won the championship following a 3-11 to 0-13 defeat of Galway in the All-Ireland final. This was their 10th All-Ireland title overall and their first championship title since 1988.

Tipperary's Eugene O'Neill was the championship's top scorer with 5-18.

Results

Leinster Under-21 Hurling Championship

Quarter-finals

Semi-finals

Final

Munster Under-21 Hurling Championship

Quarter-finals

Semi-finals

Final

Ulster Under-21 Hurling Championship

Semi-finals

Final

All-Ireland Under-21 Hurling Championship

Semi-finals

Final

Championship statistics

Miscellaneous

 The All-Ireland final was the first meeting of Cork and Galway at that stage of the championship since 1982.
 Cork's final victory gave them their 100th All-Ireland title overall.

References

Under
All-Ireland Under-21 Hurling Championship